Maximilian Lerner (September 4, 1924 – September 10, 2022) was an Austrian-born American, known for his work in the Military Intelligence Service during World War II.  His training at Camp Ritchie during WWII classifies him as one of the Ritchie Boys.

Early life
Lerner was born in Vienna, Austria, on September 4, 1924, the son of a furrier and a homemaker.  Shortly after the German annexation of Austria in 1938, his family moved to Paris, France, later to Nice, France.  Lerner learned French while attending high school in France.  The family moved on to Manhattan, New York in 1941, where he attended high school at night while working during the day.  At this time, he became fluent in English.

Army career
Lerner enlisted in the U.S. Army on his 18th birthday.  After basic training, he was sent to Camp Ritchie, a training center for military intelligence.  In March 1944, he was sent to Northern Ireland with the Office of Strategic Services, where he received further intelligence training from British operatives.  After D-Day, he spent a short time in Paris interviewing people who had been arrested by the French resistance, and sorting out ordinary citizens from Nazi collaborators and soldiers.  After two weeks in Paris, he was transferred to Verdun, France, where he was based for most of the rest of the war, serving missions for the Office of Strategic Services.

In March 1945, Lerner went to Germany, where he remained in the final days of the war and during the denazification process.

Later life
After returning from the war, Lerner attended school on the GI Bill, receiving a bachelor's degree from City College of New York, and in 1952 a master's degree from Columbia University.  He started a horticultural products business, and raised a family. Lerner was one of four Ritchie Boys interviewed by 60 Minutes for his role in military intelligence during WWII. He wrote a memoir, and two spy novels.  He died on September 10, 2022, in Manhattan.

Memoir

References

1924 births
2022 deaths
Ritchie Boys
City College of New York alumni
Columbia University alumni
American people of Austrian descent
Military personnel from New York City
Writers from New York City
Writers from Vienna